Season 1883–84 was the ninth season in which Heart of Midlothian competed at a Scottish national level, entering the Scottish Cup for the ninth time.

Overview 
Hearts reached the third round of the Scottish Cup and were knocked out by Edinburgh rivals Hibs. Later that season they reached the semi final of the newly renamed East of Scotland Shield once again being knocked out by Hibs.

Results

Scottish Cup

Edinburgh Shield

Rosebery Charity Cup

See also
List of Heart of Midlothian F.C. seasons

References 

 Statistical Record 83-84

External links 
 Official Club website

Heart of Midlothian F.C. seasons
Hearts